John Hogan (born 29 December 1941) is a former Australian rules footballer who played with Collingwood in the Victorian Football League (VFL).

Notes

External links 

		

1941 births
Living people
Australian rules footballers from Victoria (Australia)
Collingwood Football Club players